Germany were represented by 74 athletes at the 2010 European Athletics Championships held in Barcelona, Spain.

Just five days before the start of the Championships, it was announced that marathon runner Falk Cierpinski had to pull out due to injury.

Participants

Results

Men
Track and road events

Field events

Women
Track and road events

Field events

Medal count

References 

2010
Nations at the 2010 European Athletics Championships
European Athletics Championships